Tangail-5 is a constituency represented in the Jatiya Sangsad (National Parliament) of Bangladesh since 2014 by Sanowar Hossain of the Awami League.

Boundaries 
The constituency encompasses Tangail Sadar Upazila.

Ahead of the 2008 general election, the Election Commission redrew constituency boundaries to reflect population changes revealed by the 2001 Bangladesh census. The 2008 redistricting altered the boundaries of the constituency.

History 
The constituency was created for the first general elections in newly independent Bangladesh, held in 1973.

Members of Parliament

Elections

Elections in the 2010s 

In December 2009, the High Court declared that Quasem's 2008 candidacy had been illegal and vacated the seat. The  Election Commission declared Mahmudul Hasan, the runner up, elected. After the appeals process concluded, Hasan took office in August 2012.

Elections in the 2000s

Elections in the 1990s

References

External links
 

Parliamentary constituencies in Bangladesh
Tangail District